Fatima binti Baraka (in Arabic: فاطمة بنت بركة) (c. 1910 – 17 April 2013), also known as Bi Kidude, was a Zanzibari-born Tanzanian Taarab singer. She has been called the "queen of Taarab and Unyago music" and was inspired by Siti binti Saad. Born in the village of Mfagimaringo, Bi Kidude was the daughter of a coconut seller in colonial Zanzibar. Bi Kidude's exact date of birth is unknown and much of her life story is uncorroborated, but she was believed to be the oldest touring singer in the world before her death. In 2005, Bi Kidude received the WOMEX award for her contribution to music and culture in Zanzibar. She was the subject of two documentaries by film maker Andrew Jones.

Awards and nominations

Honours

Awards
 2005 WOMEX award

Nominations
2011 Tanzania Music Awards - Best Collaboration & Best Traditional Song ('Ahmada' with Offside trick)

See also
 Music of Tanzania
 Taarab

References

External links
 Bi Kidude Honored with World Music Award
 The Venerable Queen of Taarab and Unyago
 As Old As My Tongue: the myth and life of Bi Kidude documentary film on Bi Kidude.
 Biographic Notes
 Some recordings (An interview)

1910s births
2013 deaths
Year of birth uncertain
Zanzibari people
20th-century Tanzanian women singers
Tanzanian musicians
Culture of Zanzibar
 Swahili-language singers